Åse Michaelsen (born 4 June 1960 in Mandal) is a Norwegian politician representing the Progress Party. She served as a representative of Vest-Agder in the Storting and was first elected in 2005. She was also  the Minister of Elderly and Public Health from 2018 to 2019.

Storting committees
2005–2009 member of the Church, Education and Research committee.
2005–2009 member of the Electoral committee.
2005–2009 vice secretary of the Lagting.

External links
 
  Fremskrittspartiet - Biography

1960 births
Living people
Progress Party (Norway) politicians
Women members of the Storting
Members of the Storting
21st-century Norwegian politicians
21st-century Norwegian women politicians